Rownhams is a village in Hampshire, England, situated just outside the boundaries of the City of Southampton, to the north-west. It is in the civil parish of Nursling and Rownhams.   Rownhams services is a nearby service station on the M27 motorway that runs to the north of the village.

The village consists of over 1200 homes. Rownhams house, a Georgian mansion, is now a business park and wedding venue, The parish church is St John the Evangelist. There is a community centre, a primary school, two pre-schools  and a hairdressing salon. The village is planned to grow in the next few years as several planning applications are either in the system or have been approved.

For many years the parish and village has been combined with Nursling and also Toothill, which were once separate independent villages. Hence, for example, the churches are joined in the joint parish of Nursling and Rownhams with one incumbent and run by one parochial church council.

The village has been twinned with the village of Percy-en-Auge in Normandy since 1988.

Many of the activities and facilities are shared between Rownhams and Nursling, e.g. Ladies' night,  two Brownie packs, a full set of groups of Scouts, a friendship club for "senior residents", Retired Men's Fellowship and a toddler group. Also a badminton club, an amateur astronomers' group, who use an observatory at Toothill, a writers' group, "Coffee Break" - a drop in for anybody home alone, a carer or being cared for in the community, and a dance school.

References

External links

Nursling and Rownhams History Group Local History in Nursling and Rownhams, Hampshire
Romsey Local History Society Local History in Romsey and its surrounding area

Villages in Hampshire
Southampton